SM UB-44 was a Type UB II submarine or U-boat for the German Imperial Navy during World War I. UB-44 operated in the Mediterranean and disappeared in August 1916.

UB-44 was ordered in July 1915 and was laid down at the AG Weser shipyard in Bremen in September. She was equipped to carry a complement of four torpedoes for her two bow torpedo tubes and had an  deck gun. As part of a group of six submarines selected for Mediterranean service, UB-44 was broken into railcar sized components and shipped to Pola where she was assembled and launched in April 1916 and commissioned in May.

In early August 1916, UB-44 departed from Cattaro for Hersingstand and never arrived. Her fate is officially unknown, but she may have been sunk by a torpedo boat near the island of Paxoi on 8 August.

Design and construction 
The German UB II design improved upon the design of the UB I boats, which had been ordered in September 1914. In service, the UB I boats were found to be too small and too slow. A major problem was that, because they had a single propeller shaft/engine combo, if either component failed, the U-boat became almost totally disabled. To rectify this flaw, the UB II boats featured twin propeller shafts and twin engines (one shaft for each engine), which also increased the U-boat's top speed. The new design also included more powerful batteries, larger torpedo tubes, and a deck gun. As a UB II boat, U-47 could also carry twice the torpedo load of her UB I counterparts, and nearly ten times as much fuel. To contain all of these changes the hull was larger, and the surface and submerged displacement was more than double that of the UB I boats.

She had a single hull with saddle tanks and had a draught of  when surfaced. She displaced  while submerged but only  on the surface.

The submarine was equipped with twin Daimler diesel engines and twin Siemens-Schuckert electric motors—for surfaced and submerged running, respectively—that drove one propeller shaft.

UB-44 was equipped with two  bow torpedo tubes and could carry four torpedoes. The U-boat was also armed with one  Uk L/30 deck gun.

UB-44 was laid down by AG Weser at its Bremen shipyard on 3 September 1915. As one of six U-boats selected for service in the Mediterranean while under construction, UB-44 was broken into railcar-sized components and shipped overland to the Austro-Hungarian port of Pola. Shipyard workers from Weser assembled the boat and her five sisters at Pola, where she was launched on 20 April 1916.

Service career 
SM UB-44 was commissioned into the German Imperial Navy on 11 May 1916 under the command of Oberleutnant zur See 	Franz Wäger. UB-44, Wäger's fourth U-boat command, was assigned to the Navy's Pola Flotilla. Although the flotilla was based in Pola, the site of the main Austro-Hungarian Navy base, boats of the flotilla operated out of the Austro-Hungarian base at Cattaro which was located farther south and closer to the Mediterranean. German U-boats typically returned to Pola only for repairs.

The 3,409-gross register ton British steamer was carrying a general cargo from Glasgow for Alexandria when she went down with the loss of three men.

After Germany's conquest of Romania (see Romania during World War I), the German Imperial Navy had sufficient fuel oil for submarines located in the Black Sea. UB-44 and three of her sister ships in the Pola Flotilla were ordered to Constantinople and, en route, had to navigate through the Dardanelles, which had been heavily mined by the Allies in the middle of 1916. UB-44 departed from Cattaro on 8 August for Hersingstand (located on the Gallipoli peninsula) to pick up a pilot for the trip through the Dardanelles, but never arrived.

UB-44s fate is unknown. Two British post-war reports list UB-44 as falling victim to the Otranto Barrage on 30 July but, as author Dwight Messimer points out, German records record UB-44s departure from Cattaro nine days after that. Messimer reports that it is possible that UB-44 was sunk by the torpedo boat HMS 368 (probably the French TB368, based at Brindisi), which was reported by an Athenian newspaper as sinking a U-boat  on 8 August off Paxoi with a lance bomb.

Summary of raiding history

References

Notes

Citations

Bibliography 

 

 
 
 
 
 
 

German Type UB II submarines
U-boats commissioned in 1916
World War I submarines of Germany
Maritime incidents in 1916
U-boats sunk in 1916
1916 ships
Missing U-boats of World War I